Nafaa Benami (born 8 November 1974) is an Algerian weightlifter. He competed in the men's bantamweight event at the 2004 Summer Olympics.

References

External links
 

1974 births
Living people
Algerian male weightlifters
Olympic weightlifters of Algeria
Weightlifters at the 2004 Summer Olympics
Place of birth missing (living people)
21st-century Algerian people